The IPE 02 Nhapecan is a sailplane that was produced in Brazil in the 1970s and 1980s. It is a conventional, two seat design of wooden construction.

Design and development 
During works on the IPE KW-2 Biguá, IPE they decided to develop a new two-seater model based on the Biguá.  First of all, conventional instead of negatively swept wings were designed, as well as a new nose and other small details. The first flight of the new aircraft as IPE 02a Nhapecan was on May 24, 1979. After extensive testing, the prototype was sold and continued to fly for many years. 

The IPE 02 Nhapecan was a two-seat glider with tandem seats and an enclosed cockpit. The fuselage was made of welded steel tubes and was covered with plywood. The wings were of wooden construction and covered with fabric. Under the fuselage was a single wheel.  The fuselage was made of welded steel tubes and covered with fiberglass-reinforced plastic. As with the initial model, the wings were a wooden construction covered with fabric. Under the fuselage was a small wheel at the nose and a larger wheel in the center. In addition, there were structural modifications and fixed ballast.

Variants

IPE 02A Nhapecan I
First prototype of the glider family, which flew for the first time on May 24, 1979 with registration PP-ZQL. At least two prototypes produced, did not make it into series production.

IPE 02B Nhapecan II 
Primary instructional model, certified in 1986, with 80 produced by the 1990.

IPE Nhapecan III 
Prototype of an improved version of version II, it did not make it into series production. A built prototype.

Operators

 Brazilian Air Force – 10 IPE 02 Nhapecan II

Specifications (Nhapecan II)

See also

References
 
 

Notes

External links

1970s Brazilian civil aircraft
1970s Brazilian sailplanes
Aircraft first flown in 1979
High-wing aircraft